Malik Zulu Shabazz (born Paris Lewis on September 7, 1966) is an American attorney. He has previously served as Chairman of the New Black Panther Party which is labeled as a hate group , he is the current National President of Black Lawyers for Justice, which he co-founded.

Shabazz announced on an October 14, 2013 online radio broadcast that he was stepping down from his leadership position in the New Black Panther Party and that Hashim Nzinga, then national chief of staff, would replace him. He is an occasional guest on television talk shows.

The Anti-Defamation League describes Shabazz as "anti-Semitic and racist" and the Southern Poverty Law Center (SPLC)'s Intelligence Project's Intelligence Report, which monitors what the SPLC considers Radical right (United States) hate groups and extremists in the United States has included Shabazz in its files since a 2002 Washington, D.C. protest at B'nai B'rith International at which Shabazz shouted: "Kill every goddamn Zionist in Israel! Goddamn little babies, goddamn old ladies! Blow up Zionist supermarkets!"

Early life and legal career
Shabazz was born in 1966 as Paris Lewis and raised in Los Angeles. Shabazz says his father, James Lewis, was a Muslim who was killed when Shabazz was a child. Shabazz was raised by his mother, whom he describes as a successful businesswoman. His grandfather, who introduced him to the Nation of Islam, was also a strong influence.

Shabazz graduated from Howard University and Howard University School of Law. In 1994, Shabazz was fired from a position with then Washington D.C. Mayor Marion Barry, who criticized Shabazz for statements "regarding other people's cultural history, religion and race that do not reflect the spirit of my campaign, my personal views or my spirituality."

In 1995, while he was a law student, Shabazz ran his first unsuccessful campaign for a seat on the Council of the District of Columbia. In 1996, Shabazz founded Black Lawyers for Justice. In 1998, Shabazz was named "Young Lawyer of the Year" by the National Bar Association, the nation's leading black lawyers' association, and ran, unsuccessfully again, for a seat on the D.C. Council.

Public attention
Shabazz first came to widespread public attention in 1994, when Unity Nation, a student group he founded at Howard University, invited Khalid Abdul Muhammad, chairman of the New Black Panther Party, to speak. Introducing the speaker, Shabazz engaged in a call and response with the audience:

A year later, Shabazz told an interviewer that everything he said was true, with the possible exception of the assertion concerning Nat Turner.

New Black Panther Party
Shabazz followed Muhammad's lead and joined the New Black Panther Party about 1997. When Muhammad, who greatly expanded the organization and rose to its chairmanship, died in early  2001, Shabazz took over as National Chairman.

The principles Shabazz purports to promote include the following: 
Black nationalism
Black Power
Support for reparations for slavery
Conspiracy theories about Jewish involvement in the September 11 attacks
The view that Jews dominated the Atlantic slave trade
Anti-Zionism

Prevented from entering Canada
In May 2007, Shabazz was invited by Black Youth Taking Action (BYTA) to speak at a rally at Queen's Park in Toronto, Ontario, Canada, and to give a lecture to students at Ryerson University. Shabazz arrived at Toronto Pearson International Airport as planned but Canada border officials prevented him from entering Canada because of past rhetoric that violated Canadian hate laws. Ontario Premier Dalton McGuinty expressed concern about Shabazz. The press reported that Shabazz was denied entry to Canada because of a minor criminal record. Shabazz flew back to Buffalo, New York and attempted to cross the border by car, but border agents spotted him and again prevented him from entering Canada.

2015 demonstrations in Baltimore
Shabazz helped organize and promote a demonstration in Baltimore, Maryland, on April 25, 2015, following the death of Freddie Gray, a 25-year-old African-American man who died while in the custody of the Baltimore Police Department. Addressing the crowd, Shabazz called for them to "Shut it down if you want to! Shut it down!"

Shabazz planned another protest on May 2, 2015. Some in Baltimore who had been involved with the peaceful protests expressed concerns to The Baltimore Sun about his involvement. Rev. Alvin S. Gwynn, Jr., who leads the Interdenominational Ministerial Alliance of Baltimore, described Shabazz as an "outside agitator" and another local pastor, Rev. Louis Wilson, said Shabazz does not speak for all African-Americans. Wilson added, "I've talked to people who wish he'd just stay away."

References

Further reading

External links

1966 births
Living people
African-American lawyers
African and Black nationalists
Howard University alumni
Howard University School of Law alumni
9/11 conspiracy theorists
Lawyers from Los Angeles
American conspiracy theorists
American reparationists
Anti-Zionism in the United States
20th-century African-American politicians
20th-century American politicians